René Jadfard (born 24 January 1899 in Cayenne, French Guiana; died 9 November 1947) was a politician from French Guiana who was elected to the French National Assembly in 1947, journalist and novelist.

He was killed in an airplane crash in 1947 when the small amphibious plane bringing him, the prefect  and the director of printing Monsieur Marsau crashed into the Sinnamary en route to Saint-Laurent. The pilot and the other two passengers were able to swim to safety and reach the palétuviers (mangroves) on the river bank, but Jadfard drowned.

A biography by the French Guianan politician Georges Othily: René Jadfard ou l'éclair d'une vie was published by Éditions caribéennes in 1989.

Works
Les Dieux de bronze Librairie de France 1928
D'autres sujets Compiègne 1930
Le cantique aux ténèbres Librairie de France 1930
Les revendications coloniales et l'avenir de la France Paris 1930
La France et les revendications coloniales allemandes Louis Querelle, Paris 1938
Drôle d'assassin, Paris 1939, republished Editions Caraibéennes 1988
L'assassin joue et perd Paris 1947, republished Editions Caraibéennes 1988
Le télégramme de minuit Paris 1941,republished Editions Caraibéennes 1988
Deux hommes et l'aventure Paris 1945, republished  Editions Caraibéennes 1988
Nuit de Cachiri - Récit guyanais Paris 1946, republished  Editions Caraibéennes 1988

References 

1899 births
1947 deaths
People from Cayenne
French Guianan politicians
French Section of the Workers' International politicians
Deputies of the 1st National Assembly of the French Fourth Republic
French Guianan writers
French male writers
Victims of aviation accidents or incidents in South America
20th-century French male writers